Tales Told is British singer/songwriter Ian Broudie's debut release, staging a return to his roots with traditional instruments - real drums, acoustic guitars and fiddles with no studio trickery.

Track listing
All songs on the album are written by Ian Broudie, except "Smoke Rings", which Broudie co-wrote with Terry Hall.
 "Song for No One"
 "Whenever I Do" (Ian Broudie, James Skelly)
 "He Sails Tonight" (Broudie, Skelly)
 "Smoke Rings" (Broudie, Terry Hall)
 "Got No Plans"
 "Always Knocking" (Broudie, Skelly)
 "Tales Told"
 "Lipstick"
 "Super Cinema"
 "Home from Home"
 "Something Street" (Broudie, Nick Power)
 "Broudie's Blues" (Secret track)

References

2004 debut albums
Ian Broudie albums
Deltasonic albums
Albums produced by Ian Broudie